Grikor Mirzaian Suni (Armenian Գրիգոր Միրզայեան Սիւնի) (originally Grikor Mirzaian, given name also transliterated as Grigor) (September 10, 1876, Getabek (now Gədəbəy), at the time a village in Elisabethpol Governorate of the Russian empire, now part of Azerbaijan – December 18, 1939, Philadelphia, Pennsylvania) was an Armenian composer.

The music he wrote—choral works, songs, several operas, and orchestral and instrumental works—is European classical music, but suffused with the tradition of Armenian folk music and religious music, of which he was an avid collector and registrator.

Originating from a line of musicians, he studied music from 1891 to 1895 at the Gevorgian Academy in Echmiadzin, near Yerevan, with Soghomon Soghomonian (later known as Komitas Vardapet), with whom he became friends and a long-time collaborator. 
Then he moved to St. Petersburg, where he studied music from 1895 to 1904 with Nikolai Rimsky-Korsakov, Alexander Glazunov and Anatoly Lyadov.

His great grandfather was Ashiq-Bashi (Chief Minstrel) at the court of Fath-Ali Shah. Ronald Grigor Suny, Emeritus Professor of political science at the University of Chicago, is a grandson of Grikor Mirzaian Suni.

1876 births
1939 deaths
People from Gadabay District
People from Elizavetpol Governorate
Emigrants from the Russian Empire to the United States
Armenian composers
American people of Armenian descent
20th-century classical composers
Male classical composers
20th-century American composers
20th-century American male musicians